Kaji was a title and position used by nobility of Gorkha Kingdom (1559–1768) and Kingdom of Nepal between 1768 and 1846. Many other contemporary kingdoms used the same title for their ministers.

Etymology
Historian Mahesh Chandra Regmi suggests that Kaji is derived from Sanskrit word Karyi which meant functionary.

History
Ganesh Pande was the first Kaji under King Dravya Shah of Gorkha Kingdom. He helped Dravya Shah to become King of Gorkha and was later appointed Kaji of Gorkha in 1559 A.D. Another significant Kaji of Gorkha was Kalu Pande born in the family of Ganesh Pande. He was son of Bhimraj Pande who was also a Kaji during the reign of King Nara Bhupal Shah. Kalu Pande led Gorkhalis in the Battle of Kirtipur. He had set up a base on Naikap, a hill on the valley's western rim, from where they were to mount their assaults on Kirtipur. He was killed in the battle after being surrounded by enemy forces. The ministers and officials of Kantipur Kingdom also had the title of Kaji. Kashiram Thapa was a Kaji and army commander in the reign of King Jaya Prakash Malla.

Both as per Francis Buchanan-Hamilton and Dilli Raman Regmi, there were 4 Kajis forming the government in Nepal. In the rule of King Rana Bahadur Shah, 4 Kajis were appointed and were to work under the direction of King and Chautariya. The number of officers including Kajis changed after King Rana Bahadur abdicated in favour of his minor son Girvan Yuddha Bikram Shah. During the reign of Bhimsen Thapa, there were inner and outer circle of Kajis who acted as decision-making body and military commander and governors respectively. Kaji along with Chautariya and Bada Hakim were appointed to run the administration as governors. No single family had full dominance in the position of inner circle of government. All Thapas, Pandes and Basnets held similar shares in the inner circle.

Mulkaji

Chief (Mul) Kaji was considered equivalent to Prime Minister of Nepal before King Rana Bahadur Shah created the position of Mukhtiyar in 1806 and carried executive powers of nation to completely control Nepalese administration. In 1794, King Rana Bahadur Shah came of age and appointed Kirtiman Singh Basnyat as Chief (Mul) Kaji among the newly appointed four Kajis though Damodar Pande was the most influential Kaji. Kirtiman had succeeded Abhiman Singh Basnyat as Chief Kaji. Kirtiman was secretly assassinated on 28 September 1801, by the supporters of Raj Rajeshwari Devi and his brother Bakhtawar Singh Basnyat, was then given the post of Chief (Mul) Kaji. Later Damodar Pande was appointed by Queen Rajrajeshwari as Chief Kaji. After the execution of Mulkaji Damodar Pande in March 1804, Ranajit Pande was appointed as Mulkaji (Chief Kaji) along with Bhimsen Thapa as second Kaji, Sher Bahadur Shah as Mul Chautariya and Ranganath Paudel as Raj Guru (Royal Preceptor).

List of people with title Kaji

 Abhiman Singh Basnet (Mulkaji)
 Abhiman Singh Rana Magar (Kaji Mulki Dewan)
 Amar Singh Thapa (Sanukaji)
 Amar Singh Thapa Chhetri (Badakaji)
 Bakhtawar Singh Basnyat (Mulkaji)
 Bal Narsingh Kunwar (Kaji)
 Bamsa Raj Pande (Dewan Kaji)
 Bhimsen Thapa (Kaji later Mukhtiyar)
Biraj Thapa Magar (Kaji of Gorkha)
 Damodar Pande (Mulkaji)
 Dhokal Singh Basnyat (Kaji)
 Gagan Singh Bhandari (Kaji)
Gajianesh Pandey (Kaji of Gorkha)
 Jung Bahadur Rana (Kaji later Prime Minister)
 Kalu Pande (Kaji of Gorkha)
 Kashiram Thapa (Kaji of Kantipur)
 Kehar Singh Basnyat (Kaji)
 Kirtiman Singh Basnyat (Mulkaji)
 Mathabarsingh Thapa (Kaji later Mukhtiyar)
 Nain Singh Thapa (Kaji General)
 Ram Krishna Kunwar (Kaji Jethabudha)
 Ranabir Singh Thapa (Kaji General)
 Ranadhoj Thapa (Kaji)
 Rana Jang Pande (Kaji later Mukhtiyar)
 Sarbajit Rana Magar (Mulkaji)
 Shivaram Singh Basnyat (Senapati Kaji)
 Swarup Singh Karki (Kaji later Dewan)

List of people with name Kaji
Kaji was also used as given name and middle name. Notable Nepalese people with first name and middle name Kaji:

Chin Kaji Shrestha, Nepalese politician
Kaji Man Samsohang, Nepalese politician
Narayan Kaji Shrestha, Nepalese politician
Nati Kaji, Nepalese singer
Purna Kaji Tamrakar, Nepalese merchant and journalist
Raju Kaji Shakya, Nepalese footballer and coach

See also
Mukhtiyar
Senapati
Sardar
Kaji Pratha, a social practice of offering Kaji title to five Kshetri caste

References

Footnotes

Notes

Bibliography

Government of Nepal
Positions of authority
16th-century neologisms
Political history of Nepal
Social history of Nepal